Saeed Anwar is a former Pakistani cricketer and captain of the Pakistan national cricket team. He has scored centuries (100 or more runs in a single innings) in Test matches and One Day International (ODI) matches on 11 and 20 occasions respectively during his international career. He played 55 Tests and 247 ODIs for Pakistan scoring 4,052 and 8,824 runs respectively. He was described by the BBC as "a world-class opener" and "one of the real batting stars of Pakistani cricket". Anwar was named as one of the Wisden Cricketers of the Year, in 1997, and the cricket almanac Wisden noted his "rapid run-scoring".

Anwar made his Test debut against the West Indies in a match where he was dismissed without scoring in either innings at the Iqbal Stadium, Faisalabad in 1990. His first Test century came against New Zealand at the Basin Reserve, Wellington in 1994. His highest Test score of 188 not out came against India during the 1998–99 Asian Test Championship at the Eden Gardens, Kolkata in February 1999. In the same innings, he became the third Pakistan opening batsman not to be dismissed at the close of an innings. Anwar scored Test centuries against seven different opponents at ten cricket grounds, including seven at venues outside Pakistan. As of November 2016, he is ninth in the list of Test century-makers for Pakistan, a position he shares with Asif Iqbal and Azhar Ali.

Anwar made his ODI debut during the 1988–89 Benson & Hedges World Series against the West Indies at the WACA Ground, Perth. He achieved his first ODI century a year later against Sri Lanka at the Adelaide Oval. He scored three consecutive centuries at the Sharjah Cricket Association Stadium in 1993, the second player to achieve this feat. Anwar's score of 194, the highest by a Pakistan batsman, was made against India at the M.A. Chidambaram Stadium, Chennai in 1997. He scored all of his twenty ODI centuries against six different opponents, and was most successful against Sri Lanka, making seven against them. As of November 2016, Anwar is the leading ODI century-maker for Pakistan, and is twelfth in the list of ODI century-makers.

Key

Test cricket centuries

One Day International centuries

Notes

References

General

Specific

External links 

Anwar
Anwar, Saeed